Treaty of Andernach can refer to one of several treaties signed in Andernach, Germany:

Treaty of Andernach (1059)
Treaty of Andernach (1292)
Treaty of Andernach (1474)